Episcopal School may refer to:

Episcopal School of Acadiana, Louisiana
Episcopal School of Dallas, Texas
Episcopal School of Jacksonville, Florida

See also
Episcopal High School (disambiguation)
List of colleges and seminaries affiliated with the Episcopal Church